Fire Hall for Engine Company No. 18 (1930) is a fire station in Nashville, Tennessee. It is listed on the National Register of Historic Places listings in Davidson County, Tennessee (NRHP) in 2016.

History
The building was planned in 1929 and an artist rendering of the building appeared in The Tennessean newspaper on October 3, 1929. It was designed by C.K Colley and Sons. The builder was W.R. Smith and Sons Company and there was a budget of $15,425. The building was operational in May of 1930 but it officially opened on Thursday, June 5, 1930.

The building was listed in the National Register of Historic Places listings in Davidson County, Tennessee on May 13, 2016. it is built in the style of Tudor Revival architecture.

References

External links
The Historical Marker Database - Engine Co. 18 Fire Hall

1930 establishments in Tennessee
National Register of Historic Places in Nashville, Tennessee
Houses on the National Register of Historic Places in Tennessee